Samia Maxine Longchambon (née Ghadie, previously Smith; born 13 July 1982) is an English actress. She has played the role of Maria Connor in the ITV soap opera Coronation Street since 2000.

Early life
Samia Ghadie was born in Eccles, Greater Manchester to Joseph, a French-Lebanese shop owner and Patsy, an English actress whom he met whilst working in Abu Dhabi. Samia lived there for a period as a child. She has a brother named Tariq.

Career
Longchambon first appeared as an extra in Coronation Street at the age of eight and 10 years later she became a regular on the show. She made her first credited TV appearance when she was 11 years old, appearing in an episode of Cracker ("The Big Crunch"). She also made appearances in Children's Ward, Heartbeat, Doctors, There's Only One Jimmy Grimble (feature film) and the children's series Life Force. In 2000, she beat both Suzanne Shaw and Kimberley Walsh to get the role of Maria Sutherland in the ITV soap opera Coronation Street. In Autumn 2009, she took a short break from her role as Maria in Coronation Street on maternity leave and resumed her role in the show in May 2010. She won an episode of Celebrity Stars in Their Eyes impersonating Holly Valance. She also made an appearance in Bo' Selecta! in 2004 as part of a Coronation Street sketch along with co-star Suranne Jones.

In January 2013, Longchambon was a competitor in the eighth series of Dancing on Ice, partnered with French professional ice skater Sylvain Longchambon. However, she was concussed a few days into the pre-series training and unfortunately eliminated in week eight of the competition, losing out in a skate-off to Luke Campbell.

Personal life
Samia married Matt Smith, a property developer, at St Philip's Church in Alderley Edge, Cheshire on 10 September 2005 after a seven-month engagement. On 19 October 2009, she gave birth to a baby girl, Freya, following which she left Coronation Street temporarily on maternity leave. On 4 January 2011, she and her husband announced that they had separated by mutual agreement. On 4 November 2011, she revealed that she had reverted to her maiden surname of Ghadie following a decree absolute which had been granted the same day. In May 2015, she announced her engagement to French professional ice skater Sylvain Longchambon. They married in August 2016. Their son, Yves Joseph Longchambon, was born on 24 September 2015.

Samia's father Joseph died of cancer on 14 April 2009.

Filmography

Film

Television

Guest appearances
Samia has appeared twice on the ITV game show, All Star Family Fortunes. Her first appearance was in a Christmas special in December 2006, when she appeared as part of the Battersby-Brown family. Her second appearance was in May 2012, when she appeared with her own family. In 2008, by then known as Samia Smith, she appeared as a guest on Keith Lemon's Very Brilliant World Tour when the show visited Egypt. On 20 September 2014, Samia appeared as a contestant on the primetime game show, The Chase: Celebrity Special.

Awards and nominations

See also
 List of Dancing on Ice contestants

References

External links
 

1982 births
Living people
English people of Lebanese descent
English people of French descent
English child actresses
English film actresses
English soap opera actresses
English television actresses
People from Eccles, Greater Manchester
20th-century English actresses
21st-century English actresses
Actresses from Salford